James Peter Davis (June 9, 1904 – March 4, 1988) was an American prelate of the Roman Catholic Church. He served as Bishop (later Archbishop) of San Juan (1943–1964) and Archbishop of Santa Fe (1964–1974).

Biography
James Davis was born in Houghton, Michigan, the only child of John Frank and Elizabeth R. (née Didier) Davis. He and his family moved to Topeka, Kansas, and afterwards to Flagstaff, Arizona. He studied at St. Patrick's Seminary in Menlo Park, California, and was ordained to the priesthood on May 19, 1929. He served as chancellor of the Diocese of Tucson from 1930 to 1932.

On July 3, 1943, Davis was appointed Bishop of San Juan in Puerto Rico by Pope Pius XII. He received his episcopal consecration on the following October 6 from Bishop Daniel James Gercke, with Bishops Thomas Arthur Connolly and Joseph Thomas McGucken serving as co-consecrators. In 1958, he estimated that 90 percent of Puerto Ricans were nominally Catholics, while only 30 percent practiced their faith. A strong opponent of Luis Muñoz Marín, Davis once declared he "will never climb the steps of the Fortaleza as long as Luis Muñoz Marín is Governor of Puerto Rico." In 1960, he and two other bishops issued a pastoral letter that prohibited Catholics from voting for Muñoz Marín's Popular Democratic Party. However, he later said there would be no punishment for Catholics who violated this order.

He was promoted to the first Archbishop of San Juan, Puerto Rico April 30, 1960. In 1963, Davis' predecessor in the see of San Juan, Edwin Byrne, died while serving as Archbishop of Santa Fe. In 1964, Pope Paul VI transferred Davis into Byrne's former position again,  appointing him to be the ninth Archbishop of Santa Fe, New Mexico.

Five years before reaching the mandatory age of retirement for a bishop according to canon law, he retired as Archbishop of Santa Fe in 1974. He died in Phoenix, Arizona, in 1988. He was buried at Cathedral Basilica of Saint Francis of Assisi in Santa Fe, New Mexico.

References

External links and additional sources
 (for Chronology of Bishops) 
 (for Chronology of Bishops) 

1904 births
1988 deaths
20th-century Roman Catholic archbishops in Puerto Rico
Participants in the Second Vatican Council
Saint Patrick's Seminary and University alumni
People from Houghton, Michigan
Roman Catholic archbishops of Santa Fe
Catholics from Michigan
Roman Catholic bishops of San Juan de Puerto Rico
Roman Catholic archbishops of San Juan de Puerto Rico